Edward Leo Finnigan (May 10, 1911 – July 10, 1968) was an American football and basketball coach and player. He served as the head football coach at Baldwin–Wallace College—now known as Baldwin Wallace University—from 1949 to 1950 and at Western Reserve University—now known as Case Western Reserve University—from 1951 to 1965, compiling a career college football coaching record of 68–52–9.  Finnegan was also the head basketball coach at Baldwin–Wallace from 1935 to 1940, tallying a mark of 25–56.

Playing career
In high school, Finnigan was a star athlete at John Adams High School in Cleveland.

Finnegan was the first Western Reserve University athlete to earn nine varsity letters—three each in football, basketball, and track—at a time when freshmen were unable to play varsity sports.  He was football team captain and quarterback his senior year in 1932 leading the Red Cats to a 7–1 record.

His best sport was basketball, where he was an All-American during the 1932–33 season.

Honors and death
In recognition of his many contributions to the athletic community, both the cities of Berea and Cleveland proclaimed November 4, 1967 as "Eddie Finnigan Day".

Finnegan died of cancer July 10, 1968, at the Cleveland Clinic.

Present day, the roadway in between DiSanto Field and Nobby's Ballpark is named "Finnegan's Way."

Head coaching record

References

External links
 Encyclopedia of Baldwin Wallace University History: Edward "Eddie" Finnigan

1911 births
1968 deaths
American men's basketball players
American football quarterbacks
Baldwin Wallace Yellow Jackets football coaches
Baldwin Wallace Yellow Jackets men's basketball coaches
Case Western Spartans athletic directors
Case Western Spartans football coaches
Case Western Spartans football players
Case Western Spartans men's basketball players
College men's track and field athletes in the United States
All-American college men's basketball players
Sportspeople from Cleveland
Coaches of American football from Ohio
Players of American football from Cleveland
Basketball coaches from Ohio
Basketball players from Cleveland
Deaths from cancer in Ohio
John Adams High School (Ohio) alumni